Esguerra is a surname. It is a Castilianized form of the Basque word "Ezkerra", meaning "left-handed". Notable people with the surname include:

Domingo Esguerra Plata (1875–1965), Colombian lawyer and diplomat
Juan Carlos Esguerra Portocarrero (born 1949), Colombian lawyer and politician
Rafael Esguerra, Colombian architect
[Manuel Esguerra], Diplomat, Colombia. Esguerra-Barcenas Treaty.
[Jorge Esguerra], Politician, Colombia
[Maria Angela Esguerra],  Dr. Of Naturopathic Medicine, research on natural health related to multiple sclerosis and other chronic disease.

 
Basque-language surnames